Mad Love the Prequel is the first extended play by Jamaican singer Sean Paul. It was released by SPJ Productions and Island Records on 29 June 2018. The EP spawned six singles: "No Lie" featuring Dua Lipa, "Tek Weh Yuh Heart" featuring Tory Lanez, "Body" featuring Migos, "Mad Love" with David Guetta featuring Becky G, "Tip Pon It" featuring Major Lazer, and "Naked Truth" featuring Jhené Aiko.

Track listing
Credits adapted from Tidal.

Notes
  signifies a co-producer

Personnel
Credits adapted from Tidal.

Musicians
 Sean Paul – vocals 
 Jhené Aiko – vocals 
 Malcolm Olangundoye – keyboard 
 Uche Ben Ebele – keyboard 
 Obi Fred Ebele – keyboard , 5-string banjo 
 Yannick Rastogi – bass guitar , drums , synthesizer , background vocals 
 Zacharie Raymond – bass guitar , drums , synthesizer , background vocals 
 Ellie Goulding – vocals 
 Becky G – vocals 
 Teddy Geiger – keyboard 
 Stefflon Don – vocals 
 Migos – vocals 
 Donovan Bennett – keyboard 
 Matthew Keaveny – keyboard 
 Tory Lanez – vocals 
 Dua Lipa – vocals 

Technical
 Chris Athens – master engineering 
 Gary Bannister – engineering 
 Zacharie Raymond – engineering , programming 
 Yannick Rastogi – engineering , programming 
 Bill Zimmerman – mixing assistance 
 Phil Tan – mixing 
 Uche Ben Ebele – programming 
 Obi Fred Ebele – programming 
 John Hanes – mix engineering 
 Serban Ghenea – mixing 
 Joe Kearns – vocal production
 Jeff Gunnell – engineering 
 Connor Mason – engineering 
 Julian Bunetta – engineering , programming 
 Teddy Geiger – programming 
 James F Reynolds – mixing 
 Jr Blender – programming 
 Boaz van de Beatz – programming 
 Diplo – programming 
 Rymez – programming 
 Donovan Bennett – mixing , programming 
 Matthew Keaveny – programming , master engineering 
 Joel Augustin – programming 
 Barry Grint – master engineering 
 Paul Bailey – engineering 
 James Royo – mixing

Charts

Release history

References

2018 debut EPs
Albums produced by David Guetta
Albums produced by Diplo
Island Records EPs
Sean Paul albums